Mastodon Mountain is located on the border of Alberta and British Columbia. It was named in 1922 by Arthur O. Wheeler.

See also
 List of peaks on the Alberta–British Columbia border
 Mountains of Alberta
 Mountains of British Columbia

References

Mastodon Mountain
Mastodon Mountain
Canadian Rockies